Dominic Crotty (born 28 July 1974, Cork) is a retired Irish rugby union player.

Playing career

During the munster schools cup quarter final against Crescent in February 1991, Crotty announced his arrival as a talent by kicking a match-equalising conversion, thus forcing a replay in Cork which his team won. He was 16 at the time. Years later, in UCC, he scored against UCD at the Mardyke. Crotty played at Fullback and also on the Wing for Garryowen, Munster and the Irish national team, earning five caps between 1996 and 2000.

References

External links
Munster Profile

Irish rugby union players
Ireland international rugby union players
Munster Rugby players
Garryowen Football Club players
University College Cork RFC players
Living people
1974 births
Rugby union players from County Cork
Rugby union wings